The Cape Verde buzzard (Buteo bannermani) is a medium to large bird of prey that is sometimes considered a subspecies of the widespread common buzzard (Buteo buteo). As its name implies, it is native to Cape Verde.  Some taxonomists consider it to be a distinct species.

See also 
 List of birds of Cape Verde

References

 Clements, J. F., T. S. Schulenberg, M. J. Iliff, B.L. Sullivan, C. L. Wood, and D. Roberson. 2011. The Clements checklist of birds of the world: Version 6.6. Downloaded from https://web.archive.org/web/20100821172048/http://www.birds.cornell.edu/clementschecklist/downloadable-clements-checklist

Buteo
Birds of prey of Africa
Birds of Cape Verde
Birds described in 1919
Taxa named by Harry Kirke Swann
Endemic birds of Cape Verde